María Lardizábal (born 15 February 1968) is a Honduran swimmer. She competed in two events at the 1984 Summer Olympics. She was the first woman to represent Honduras at the Olympics.

References

1968 births
Living people
Honduran female swimmers
Olympic swimmers of Honduras
Swimmers at the 1984 Summer Olympics